Sør-Hålogaland is a diocese in the Church of Norway. The Diocese covers the Lutheran Church of Norway churches located within Nordland county in Norway.  The diocese is headquartered in the town of Bodø at Bodø Cathedral, the seat of the presiding Bishop Ann-Helen Fjeldstad Jusnes (since 2015).  The diocese is divided into eight deaneries .

History
In 1952, the old Diocese of Hålogaland (which covered all of Northern Norway) was split into two: the Diocese of Sør-Hålogaland (Nordland county) and the Diocese of Nord-Hålogaland (Troms, Finnmark, and Svalbard).

Bishops
The bishops of Sør-Hålogaland since its creation in 1952:

1952–1959: Wollert Krohn-Hansen 
1959–1969: Hans Edvard Wisløff
1969–1982: Bjarne Odd Weider 
1982–1992: Fredrik Grønningsæter 
1992–2006: Øystein Ingar Larsen 
2007-2015: Tor Berger Jørgensen 
Since 2015: Ann-Helen Fjeldstad Jusnes

Cathedral

The old church in Bodø was destroyed during World War II, and after the war plans were made to replace the church and make it the cathedral for the new diocese. The foundation stone was laid in 1954 and was consecrated by Bishop Wollert Krohn-Hansen in 1956. There is also a memorial to those who died in Bodø during the Second World War.

Structure
The Diocese of Sør-Hålogaland is divided into eight deaneries.  Each one corresponds to several municipalities in the diocese. Each municipality is further divided into one or more parishes which each contain one or more congregations. See each municipality below for lists of churches and parishes within them.

References

External links
 Church of Norway in Bodø 
 Bodø Cathedral

Sor-Haalogaland
Nordland
Christian organizations established in 1952
1952 establishments in Norway
Organisations based in Bodø